Akbar Firmansyah (born 1 June 2002) is an Indonesian professional footballer who plays as a left winger for Liga 2 club Gresik United.

Club career

Persebaya Surabaya
He was signed for Persebaya Surabaya to play in Liga 1 in the 2021 season. Akbar made his league debut on 4 September 2021 in a match against Borneo at the Wibawa Mukti Stadium, Cikarang.

Career statistics

Club

Notes

Honours

Club 
Persebaya Surabaya U-20
 Elite Pro Academy U-20: 2019

References

External links
 Akbar Firmansyah at Soccerway
 Akbar Firmansyah at Liga Indonesia

2002 births
Living people
Indonesian footballers
People from Surabaya
Liga 1 (Indonesia) players
Liga 2 (Indonesia) players
Persebaya Surabaya players
Gresik United players
Association football forwards
Sportspeople from Surabaya
Sportspeople from East Java